25th Anniversary Concert is a live album by Slim Whitman, released in 1973 on United Artists Records.

Track listing 
The album was released in Europe and Australia.

Side one
 Opening announcement / InstrumentalOpening of "Indian Love Call" 
 "I'm Casting My Lasso Towards the Sky" 
 "Serenade" 
 "Cool Water" 
 "Cattle Call" 
 "The Twelfth of Never" 
 "Love Song of the Waterfall" 
 "Got the All Overs for You (All over Me)" 
 Total length: 20:45

Side two
 "There's a Love Knot in My Lariat" 
 "Poor Little Angeline" 
 Medley:"China Doll" ;"Indian Love Call" ;"Rose Marie" 
 "The Old Spinning Wheel" 
 "I'll Take You Home Again Kathleen" 
 "When I Grow Too Old to Dream" 
 Total length: 21:00

Certifications

References 

1973 live albums
Slim Whitman albums
United Artists Records live albums